The Illinois Audubon Society is a nonprofit organization based in Springfield, Illinois.  Its mission statement states that the Society intends to "promote the perpetuation and appreciation of native plants and animals and the habitats that support them."

Description and history
The Illinois Audubon Society was founded in April 1897 and is Illinois' oldest non-profit independent conservation organization.  As of 2017, it has 18 chapters throughout Illinois.  Its executive offices are located at the Adams Wildlife Sanctuary, an Illinois Audubon Society-managed sanctuary on the east side of Springfield.

The Society specializes in organizing volunteer work to foster the appreciation and upkeep of managed habitat space throughout Illinois. Society properties included prairie chicken habitat grassland managed as part of the Prairie Ridge State Natural Area in southern Illinois.

Sanctuaries
 Adams Wildlife Sanctuary - 40 acres, Springfield
 Amboy Marsh Nature Preserve - 302 acres, Lee County
 Gremel Wildlife Sanctuary
 Helen & Betty Bremer Wildlife Sanctuary - Hillsboro
 Graber Grasslands Land & Water Reserve - located within the Prairie Ridge State Natural Area
 Hartman Springs Nature Preserve
 Hoberg Tract 
 Merrill Sanctuary
 Plum Island Eagle Sanctuary - 52 acres, LaSalle County
 Karcher's Post Oak Woods Nature Preserve
 Karl Bartel Grasslands Land & Water Reserve
 War Bluff Valley Sanctuary - Pope County

References

1890s in the environment
Audubon movement
Environmental organizations based in Illinois
Organizations established in 1897
Ornithological organizations in the United States